John Kay was a fifteenth-century English poet who described himself as the versificator regis (which would develop into the position of Poet Laureate of the United Kingdom) to Edward IV of England. If it ever existed, none of his poetic work remains.

References

British Poets Laureate
15th-century English poets
Year of birth unknown
Year of death unknown
English male poets